This is a list of hospitals in Bolivia. The following main hospitals are located in Bolivia:
 Centro Medico Foianini, Santa Cruz.
 Centro Medico Quirurgico Boliviano Belga, Cochabamba, private hospital.
 Clinica Angel Foianini, Santa Cruz, private hospital.
 Clinica Unifranz, La Paz, private hospital.
 Hospital La Portada, La Paz.
 Hospital Municipal Cotahuma, La Paz.
 Hospital San Vicente de Paul, Cochabamba.
 Hospital Urbari, Santa Cruz.
 Hospital Universitario Japonés, Santa Cruz.

References

List
Bolivia
Hospitals
Bolivia